The Ranworth Antiphoner is a 15th-century illuminated antiphoner of the Sarum Rite.  It was commissioned for the Church of St Helen in Ranworth in Norfolk, where it is now on display.  The volume comprises 285 vellum pages of writing and illustrations, with daily services in medieval Latin and 19 miniatures.

The manuscript was probably the Antiphoner bequeathed to the church in 1478 by William Cobbe. Previously thought to have been produced by the monks of Langley Abbey, examinations of the illuminations suggest that the Antiphoner was manufactured by a Norwich workshop – a basic antiphoner could be produced on spec, and personalised to order. Two things may back this up: 1) the insertion at the end, out of order, of the office of St Helen; 2) Revd. Enraght's suggestion of a terminus ante quem of 1443, owing to the lack of a feast of St Raphael, which was instituted in that year. Recent research has shown that it was not uncommon for churches to invest in liturgical music books by the later fifteenth century.

The Antiphoner miraculously survived the Reformation, probably thanks to the local Holdych family. It fell into private hands, including, in the 1850s, those of Henry Huth, and eventually re-surfaced at auction in 1912, where it was bought and returned to St Helen's Church.

References

Further reading
Kathleen Scott, Survey of Manuscripts Illuminated in the British Isles, vol. 6: Later Gothic Manuscripts 1390–1490.
Kathleen Scott, Dated and datable English manuscript borders c. 1395–1499.
A.I. Doyle, 'The English Provincial Book Trade before Printing' in P. Isaac, ed., Six Centuries of the Provincial Book Trade in Britain.
P. Lasko and N. J. Morgan, Medieval Art in East Anglia 1300-1520 (Norwich: Jarrold and Sons, 1973)
M. Williamson, 'Liturgical Music in the Late-Medieval Parish: Organs and Voices, Ways and Means,' in The Parish in Late-Medieval England, ed. Clive Burgess & Eamon Duffy, Harlaxton Medieval Studies, XIV (Donington: Shaun Tyas, 2006), pp. 177-242
C. Burgess and  A. Wathey, 'Mapping the Soundscape: Church Music in English Towns, 1450-1550' (Early Music History, Vol. 19 (2000), pp. 1-46)

External links
http://www.broadsideparishes.org.uk/bspicons/manuscript.htm
http://www.norfolkchurches.co.uk/ranworth/ranworth.htm
http://ranworthantiphoner.blogspot.co.uk/p/ranworth-antiphoner.html

Music illuminated manuscripts
15th-century illuminated manuscripts
Catholic liturgical books